Jeffrey Ryan Penner (born April 13, 1987) is a Canadian former professional ice hockey defenceman who played two National Hockey League (NHL) games with the Boston Bruins during the 2009–10 season.

Playing career
Undrafted, Penner made his NHL debut on March 9, 2010 against the Toronto Maple Leafs. Prior to turning professional, he played for the Dauphin Kings of the Manitoba Junior Hockey League, and the University of Alaska Fairbanks in the National Collegiate Athletic Association.  Penner played for the Providence Bruins of the American Hockey League prior to being called up to the NHL by the Bruins.

On February 28, 2011, Penner was traded by the Bruins along with Mikko Lehtonen to the Minnesota Wild in exchange for Anton Khudobin.

Career statistics

Regular season and playoffs

References

External links

 

1987 births
Living people
Alaska Nanooks men's ice hockey players
Boston Bruins players
Canadian ice hockey defencemen
Dauphin Kings players
Houston Aeros (1994–2013) players
Ice hockey people from Manitoba
Powell River Kings players
Providence Bruins players
Sportspeople from Steinbach, Manitoba
Steinbach Pistons players
Undrafted National Hockey League players